The Calvert River is a river in the Northern Territory of Australia.

Course

Fourteen tributaries feed the river including; Bloodwood Creek, Tobacco Creek, Goanna Creek, Pungalina Creek and the Little Calvert River.

Catchment
It contains no major towns and the population was 103 in 2001, 45% of whom are Aboriginal people. The river is not dammed, nor used for irrigation. The main economic activity is cattle grazing.

A total of 34 species of fish are found in the river including; the Glassfish, Barred Grunter, Sonub nosed Garfish, Milkfish, Fly-specked Hardyhead, Treadfin Silver Biddy, Flathead Goby, Spangled Perch, Barramundi, Oxeye Herring, Rainbowfish, Black-banded Rainbowfish, Northern Trout Gudgeon, Bony Bream, Catfish, Spotted Scat, Hyrtl's Tandan, Freshwater Longtom, Seven-spot Archerfish and the Giant Gudgeon. The endangered Gulf snapping turtle has been found in the upper reaches of the river.

History
The traditional owners of the area are the Garawa peoples.

The river was named by Ludwig Leichhardt when on expedition from Queensland to Darwin in 1845. He named the river for another member of his party, John Calvert, in acknowledgement of his good service to the expedition.

See also

List of rivers of Northern Territory

References

Rivers of the Northern Territory
Gulf of Carpentaria